Manjit Singh Mianwind is an Indian politician and belongs to  Shiromani Akali Dal. He was a member of the Punjab Legislative Assembly and represented Baba Bakala.

Family
His father's name is Mohinder Singh.

Political career
Mianwind was elected to Punjab Legislative Assembly from Khadoor Sahib in 2002. In 2007, he was re-elected from Khadoor Sahib. In 2012, he successfully campaigned in the new constituency Baba Bakala.

References

Living people
Indian Sikhs
Punjab, India MLAs 2012–2017
Year of birth missing (living people)
People from Tarn Taran district
Place of birth missing (living people)
Punjab, India MLAs 2002–2007
Shiromani Akali Dal politicians